Gallium monoiodide (GaI or Ga4I4) is a low-valent gallium species that acts as a reactive intermediate for many gallium-based products. Gallium(I) halides were first crystallographically characterized by Schnöckel and coworkers and have allowed a synthetic route to many low-valent gallium species. However, chemical syntheses that employ “GaI” rather than gallium(I) halide precursors have been increasingly investigated given the ease of synthesis of this reagent. While the synthetic method of Schnöckel and coworkers to synthesize gallium(I) halides require extraordinarily high temperatures, the straightforward preparation of “GaI” at near room temperature has allowed for the exploration of new gallium-based chemistries.

Synthesis 
In 1990, Malcolm Green and coworkers synthesized a “GaI” species, whose method of preparation is most widely followed. They found that ultrasonication of liquid gallium metal with iodine in a toluene solvent yields a new pale green powder that they referred to as “GaI”. Although this intermediate was relatively simple to synthesize, the chemical composition of “GaI” was not determined until the early to mid 2010s.

In 2012, the pale green GaI powder was determined to be a combination of various gallium-based species. In 2012, Widdifield and coworkers determined that “GaI” synthesized from the complete reaction of gallium metal with iodine had the chemical composition [Ga0]2[Ga+][GaI4−]. However, in 2014, Malbrecht and coworkers found in a somewhat contradictory study that the incomplete reaction of gallium metal with iodine yielded "GaI" with this chemical composition. “GaI” synthesized with longer reaction times for complete reaction had a different chemical composition [Ga0]2[Ga+]2[Ga2I62-]. Because different variants of "GaI" can access different types of chemical reactivities, these contradictory results support that the chemical composition of "GaI" must be confirmed for each preparation prior to further experimentation.

A schematic of the preparation utilized by Malbrecht and coworkers to access different "GaI" compositions is depicted above. All variants were sonicated for the amount of time listed in toluene at 30 ˚C. The resultant "GaI" powder was found to be highly air sensitive, but stable under inert atmosphere conditions for up to a year at -35 ˚C.

Characterization 
The composition of “GaI” has been probed with FT-Raman spectroscopy, powder X-ray diffraction, 69/71Ga solid-state NMR spectroscopy and 127I nuclear quadrupole resonance (NQR). M. Wilkinson and I. J. Worrall, who synthesized a “GaI” species via a different preparation in 1975, determined that “GaI” is likely a combination of gallium(0) metal, Ga2I3 and Ga2I4 based on the characteristic Raman spectra of these constituents. This hypothesis was corroborated as two variants of “GaI” were determined to have the chemical compositions [Ga0]2[Ga+][GaI4−] and [Ga0]2[Ga+]2[Ga2I62-], where [Ga+][GaI4−] can also be expressed as Ga2I4 or GaI2 and [Ga+]2[Ga2I62-] can also be expressed as Ga2I3.

[Ga0]2[Ga+][GaI4−] 
When probed by 69/71Ga solid-state NMR spectroscopy, “GaI” with chemical composition [Ga0]2[Ga+][GaI4−] has a highly deshielded signal at δiso = 4488.1(0.3) ppm with no significant gallium quadrupole interaction (QI) tensor. This is representative of a liquid gallium(0) metal rather than solid gallium(0) metal. When probed by 127I NQR, four peaks were observed at 113.69, 132.04, 134.39, and 163.71 MHz. The chemical shifts align with a Ga2I4 reference and further defends the [Ga0]2[Ga+][GaI4−] assignment. Raman spectroscopy has also confirmed this composition assignment with vibrational frequencies identified at 141 (strong), 230 (weak) and 85 (weak) cm−1. While these frequencies match the reference for Ga2I4, they also overlap with a GaI3 reference. However, given the shape of the spectra, evidence from other spectroscopic methods, and power x-ray diffraction patterns, the assignment of [Ga0]2[Ga+][GaI4−] for this “GaI” variant was validated.

[Ga0]2[Ga+]2[Ga2I62-] 
When probed by 127I NQR, three peaks were observed at 106.35, 107.83, and 123.54 MHz, which align with the assignment to Ga2I3. Raman spectroscopy has also confirmed this assignment with vibrational frequencies at 124 (strong), 292 (weak) and 188 (weak) cm−1. These frequencies align with those from a Ga4I6 reference. Finally, power x-ray diffraction supports that this “GaI” variant matches that of characteristic Ga2I3, which is different from that of GaI2.

69/71Ga SSNMR of "GaI" 
There have been some conflicting reports in interpreting the 69/71Ga solid-state NMR spectra of the two "GaI" variants. One interpretation is that a signal at δiso = -424(5) ppm with a non-zero QI tensor is characteristic of a distorted tetrahedral [GaI4−] constituent. Thus, this spectra would defend a [Ga0]2[Ga+][GaI4−] assignment. However, another finding shows that this signal at δiso = -425(3) is seen in conjunction with another peak at δiso = 15(5) ppm. In this case, the peak at δiso = -425(3) could correspond to Ga+ as seen within GaI2, and δiso = 15(5) ppm could correspond to [Ga2I62-]. Thus, this spectra could also defend a [Ga0]2[Ga+]2[Ga2I62-] assignment. These differing interpretations suggest that 69/71Ga solid-state NMR alone will not be able to conclusively assign a specific chemical composition to a "GaI" variant. 69/71Ga solid-state NMR should be analyzed in conjunction with other spectroscopic measurements to make these assignments robust.

It is important to note that because [Ga0]2[Ga+][GaI4−] can convert to [Ga0]2[Ga+]2[Ga2I62-] over time the chemical composition of "GaI" should be verified for products that can only be accessed with one "GaI" variant.

Reactivity 

While there is some discrepancy with how these different "GaI" variants are obtained (i.e. length of reaction, temperature of reaction, time of degradation), the fact that two different "GaI" variants can be accessed provides some insight into how such a wide range of reactivities can be accessed via "GaI".

“GaI” is used as a precursor for a variety of reactions. Early-on, “GaI” was shown to access alkylgallium diiodides via oxidative addition by reacting liquid gallium metal and iodine in the presence of an alkyl iodide, RI. Since then, other organogallium complexes have been accessed, as well as Lewis base adducts and gallium based clusters. Some of these chemistries are explained in further detail below.

Ga Lewis base adducts 

“GaI” can react with a wide range of monodentate Lewis bases to form Ga(II), Ga(III), or mixed valent species, as well as gallium-based dimers and trimers. For example, “GaI” can react with primary, secondary, and tertiary amines, secondary or tertiary phosphines or ethers to form Ga(II)-Ga(II) dimers. "GaI" can also react with PPh3 to form a Ga(III)I3PPh3 complex. It can also react with a less sterically encumbered PEt3 ligand to form a Ga(II)-Ga(I)-Ga(II) mixed valent complex with datively coordinated PEt3 ligands. While the exact composition of the "GaI" starting material from which these adducts are derived is uncertain, it is believed that these reactions occur via disproportionation given that solid Ga metal is deposited upon reaction.

Interestingly, when "GaI" reacts with SbPh3 in similar reaction conditions as with the PPh3 ligand, we observe a SbPh3 fragment datively bonded to a GaPhI2 fragment. The difference in reactivity between PPh3 and SbPh3, a heavy atom analogue of PPh3, can be attributed to a weaker Sb-C bond, allowing for transfer of a phenyl group from antimony to gallium. This suggests that "GaI" can be used as a reducing agent as well.

When N-heterocyclic carbenes were reacted with "GaI", only a sterically encumbered IPr ligand was shown to form a Lewis base adduct. However, as described below, "GaI" has been shown to react with diazabutadienes and subsequent reduction by potassium metal to form Ga analogues of NHCs. Other Ga based carbenes can be accessed from a "GaI" precursor using Li[nacnac].

While monodentate Lewis bases form Ga adducts that access a wide range of Ga oxidation states, when “GaI” reacts with multidentate Lewis bases, Ga(III) complexes are predominantly formed. This reactivity has been probed with bipyridine (bipy), phenyl-terpyridine (Phterpy), and bis(imino)pyridine (bimpy) ligands, all of which have yielded Ga(III) complexes. Crystallographically, the bipy derivative has been shown to adopt a distorted octahedral geometry, with a Ga–N bond length of 2.063 Å. The Phterpy derivative adopts a distorted trigonal bipyramidal geometry where the two equatorial Ga–N bonds (as drawn) are longer than the axial Ga-N bond, with 2.104 Å and 2.007(5) Å bond lengths respectively. The average Ga-N bond length (2.071 Å) has been shown to be similar to that of a neutral GaCl3(terpy) Lewis base adduct (2.086 Å). The bimpy derivative is described as having a distorted square-based pyramidal geometry. Like for the Phterpy derivative, the equatorial imino Ga-N bonds (2.203 Å) were found to be longer than the axial pyridyl Ga-N bond (2.014(7) A˚). Despite these similar reactivities and bond characteristics, when "GaI" was reacted with imino-substituted pyridines (RN=C(H)Py), unique reactivity was observed. Reductive coupling of the imino-substituted pyridines formed diamido-digallium(III) complexes. Such reactivity points toward the usefulness of "GaI" precursors in organic synthesis, given the formation of new C-C bonds.

Ga heterocycles 
“GaI” can also be used as a precursor to form gallium-based heterocycles. Reactions with diazabutadienes, {RN=C(H)}2, can form monomers or dimers based on the substituents on the diazabutadienes. More sterically hindered substituents such as But have resulted in the formation of Ga(II) dimers, whereas reactions with alkyl or aryl substituted diazabutadienes have formed Ga(III) monomers. Two equivalents of "GaI" can be reacted with phenyl-substituted 1,4-diazabuta-1,3-dienes to form a Ga heterocycle with a diazabutadiene monoanion. EPR spectroscopy has revealed that the diazabutadiene fragment is a paramagnetic monoanionic species rather than an ene-diamido dianion or a neutral ligand. Thus, "GaI" undergoes a disproportionation reaction to form a Ga(III) complex with deposition of a Ga(0) metal. Upon further reaction with a 1,4-dilithiated diazabutadiene, this Ga heterocycle forms a new complex with the diazabutadiene monoanion fragment datively bonded (Ga-N bond lengths 1.9678(13) Å) to the Ga center and an ene-diamido dianion covalently bonded (Ga-N bond lengths 1.8831(13) Å) to the Ga center. The geometry about the Ga center suggests that the electrons in the two diazabutadiene systems do not delocalize across the entire complex.  

One very important reactivity of this Ga(III) heterocycle is its ability to access gallium analogues of N-heterocyclic carbenes upon reduction with potassium metal. Although a gallium analogue of N-heterocyclic carbenes had been synthesized previously, having access to heavier analogues of N-heterocylic carbenes from a synthetically more facile "GaI" route has opened new avenues in coordination chemistry, such as access to new Ga-M bonds.
 
"GaI" can also be used to access six-membered Ga(I) heterocycles that have parallels to gallium analogues of N-heterocyclic carbenes. These neutral Ga(I) heterocycles can be synthesized by reacting "GaI" and Li[nacnac].

GaCp and GaCp* 
Another interesting reaction with “GaI” has been the facile access to half-sandwich complexes, GaCp* and GaCp. Schnöckel first accessed hexameric GaCp* using more synthetically difficult routes. However, Jutzi and coworkers showed that GaCp*, a heavily employed ligand for transition metal complexes, can be accessed more simply by reacting "GaI" with a potassium salt of the desired ligand. To avoid benzyl iodide side products, both the "GaI" and the GaCp* ligand have been synthesized in benzene rather than toluene. Using this methodology, both Cp*Ga and (C5Me4Et)Ga have been synthesized cleanly under more practical reaction conditions.

Furthermore, Schenk and coworkers showed that GaCp, which is less sterically hindered than GaCp*, can also be accessed using a "GaI" precursor. This ligand can be synthesized with a metathesis reaction of NaCp with “GaI”. This GaCp ligand has been used to access a GaCp2I complex with datively bonded GaCp. This complex showcases an uncommon donor-acceptor Ga-Ga bond. GaCp can also be used to access a Lewis acid B(C6F5)3 complex with a datively bonded GaCp. For both of these two complexes, the GaCp* analogues have been synthesized and x-ray crystallography has supported that, as expected, GaCp* is a slightly stronger donor than GaCp.

Like GaCp*, GaCp can also coordinate to transition metal complexes such as Cr(CO)5(cyclooctene) or Co2(CO)8 to yield CpGa–Cr(CO)5 or (thf)GaCp{Co(CO)4}2. For CpGa–Cr(CO)5, the Ga-Cr bond length (239.6 pm) is similar to that for a GaCp* analogue (240.5 pm). For this complex, the trans effect is also observed, where the Cr-CO bond trans to the GaCp ligand is contracted (186 pm) relative to the cis Cr-CO bonds (189.5 pm). While GaCp can act as a terminal ligand similar to GaCp*, it was determined that GaCp analogues react faster than their GaCp* counterparts. This can be attributed to the lower steric bulk of GaCp, and Naglav and coworkers have suggested that working at lower temperatures can help access stable complexes with GaCp ligands.

Unlike reactivity with Cr(CO)5(cyclooctene), reactivities of GaCp* and GaCp with Co2(CO)8 diverge significantly. Dicobalt octacarbonyl, or Co2(CO)8, exists in various isomeric states. One such isomer contains two bridging CO ligands. When GaCp* reacts with Co2(CO)8, two equivalents of CO gas are released, forming (CO)3Co[μ2-(η5-GaCp*)]2-Co(CO)3. This is a derivative of the dicobalt octacarbonyl complex where the bridging CO moieties are replaced by bridging GaCp* moieties. On the other hand, GaCp enables oxidative addition to Co2(CO)8 to form (thf)GaCp{Co(CO)4}2, where gallium has sigma interactions to two Co(CO)4 units. The average Ga–Co bond length is 248.5 pm and gallium is in a formally +3 oxidation state in this new complex. Overall, straightforward synthesis of GaCp from a "GaI" precursor has many merits in expanding the scope of transition metal chemistry with lower valent species.

Gallium clusters 

A variety of gallium clusters have also been synthesized from a "GaI" precursor. Many gallium-based clusters have been previously synthesized from GaX precursors as prepared by Schnöckel and coworkers. However, new clusters have also been prepared with the more easily accessible "GaI" starting material. These clusters have often been isolated as salts with bulky silyl or germyl anions, such as [Si(SiMe3)3]−. An example of an isolated gallium cluster is [Ga9{Si(SiMe3)3}6]−, which has a pentagonal bipyramidal polyhedral structure. It is synthesized by reacting "GaI" with Li(thf)3Si(SiMe3)3 in toluene at -78 ˚C. This reaction has been shown to access a wide array of products, which may be attributed to the wide range of "GaI" compositions that have been subsequently probed by Malbrecht and coworkers. Of these products, [Ga9{Si(SiMe3)3}6]− is especially unique because Ga was found to have a very low average oxidation state (0.56) and also because this cluster has fewer R substituents than polyhedron vertices. Other clusters that been isolated via similar reaction pathways include [Ga10{Si(SiMe3)3}6], which is a conjuncto-polyhedral cluster, and a closo-silatetragallane anion, which contains three 2-electron-2-center and three 2-electron-3-center bonds. Interestingly, this latter species can only be synthesized when sub-stoichiometric quantities of I2 are utilized to access a "Ga2I3" intermediate species. This is equivalent to reacting liquid gallium metal and iodine to pre-completion, which, as explained above, accesses the [Ga0]2[Ga+]2[Ga2I62-] variant of "GaI". This highlights the versatility of the "GaI" precursor in accessing a wide range of gallium-based complexes.

"GaI" can also form cluster-type compounds with transition metals precursors. One example is the reaction between "GaI" and (2,6-Pmp2C6H3)2Co, (Pmp = C6Me5), which yields a nido-type cluster. This molecule has been described as being similar to a cubane, where the corners are metal and bridging iodine atoms, with one corner removed. This is a particularly unique Co-GaI cluster due to its unusual geometry for transition metal compounds containing heavy group 13 atoms such as gallium. The bond critical points and bond paths, as computed with QTAIM analysis, support that while there are Co-Ga bonds, there are no Ga-Ga bonds.

Finally, “GaI” has been able to form clusters with heavy gold atoms by acting as a reducing reagent when combined with GaCp* and LAuX (i.e. AuI(PPh3) or AuCl(PPh3)). This cluster contained the first crystallographically confirmed Ga-Au bonds. Based on the bond critical points of the Ga-Au and Au-Au bonds of this cluster, as well as NBO analysis of atomic charges, it was determined that this cluster could be best described as a Au3 cluster ligated by Ga ligands. In addition, NBO analysis showed that the charge on the galliums within the GaCp* ligands were much higher than the charge on the Au atoms and the charge on the gallium atoms within the GaI2 motifs. This suggests that non-bridging Ga-Au bonds are highly polarized, whereas the µ-bridging Ga-Au bonds are more non-polar covalent in character. While gallium cluster chemistry has been explored in great detail, being able to access clusters with the more tractable "GaI" precursor may allow the discovery of new species that cannot be accessed from other GaX precursors.

See also 

 Gallium(III) iodide
 Persistent carbene

References 

Gallium compounds
Iodides